Garden City School District is the school district for Garden City, Michigan. It serves grades K-12, and its Superintendent is Derek Fisher.

History

Before GCPS 

It is believed that the first school located on the land that is now Garden City was a log cabin built between 1840-1845. In 1847, a one-room, frame school called the East Nankin School was built. In about 1924, not too long after the formation of Garden City, four two-room frame school buildings were constructed, and just 5 years later a law was passed forming a school district for the village of Garden City.

1929-Present 

Between 1948 and 1959, nine elementary schools were constructed due to a rapid population growth of students. By 1968, 14,000 students were enrolled in its fifteen schools. Today, Garden City holds four elementary schools, one middle school, one high school, two special education schools, and an alternative high school.

School Board/ Board Offices

Board of Education 

 Patrick McNally - Secretary (Term Ends 2018)
 Lynette Childress - Trustee (Term Ends 2016)
 John Thackaberry - Treasurer (Term Ends 2018)
 Darlene Jablonowski - President (Term Ends 2016)
 Sarah Roffi - Vice President (Term Ends 2017)

Garden City High School 

Located on 6500 Middlebelt Road, Garden City High School (Michigan) houses grades 9-12. Its principal is Sharon Kollar, and its associate principals are Parker Salowich II, and Steve Herman.

Garden City Middle School 

Located on 1851 Radcliff Street, Garden City Middle School houses grades 7-8. Its principal is Kip O'Leary, and its associate principal is Kimberly Linenger.

Elementary schools

Lathers Early Childhood and Kindergarten Center 

Located on 28351 Marquette Street, Lathers houses preschool and kindergarten. Its principal is Susan Ford.

Memorial 1-2 Campus 

Located on 30001 Marquette Street, Memorial houses first and second grades. Its principal is Max Timber .

Douglas 3-4 Campus 

Located on 6400 Hartel, Douglas houses third and fourth grades. Its principal is James Bohnwagner.

Farmington 5-6 Campus 

Located on 33411 Marquette Street, Farmington houses fifth and sixth grades. Its principal is Lesley Van Sickle.

Special/ Alternative Schools

Burger Transition Center/ Burger East 

Formerly Henry Ruff Elementary, located on 30300 Maplewood Street, its director is Tim Mcluffin

Cambridge High School 
Located on 28901 Cambridge Street, Cambridge is an alternative education high school, serving grades 9-12. Its principal is Debbie Eves.

Burger Baylor School  

Garden City's only school not located in Garden City, Burger Baylor focuses on students with autism spectrum. It is located on 28865 Carlysle Street Inkster, Michigan.

Closed/ Former schools 

 Burger Middle School/ Burger School for Students with Autism spectrum - This building was razed in 2015. 
 Cambridge School - Now an adult and community education center.
 East High School - Consolidated with West High School in 1982, and the current location of Garden City High School.
 Maplewood Elementary School - Now a community center.
 Marquette Elementary School - This building has been razed.
 Radcliff Middle School - Became a satellite campus for Schoolcraft College, later sold to Garden City to become the new home of the city's Parks and Recreation department.
 Vogel Middle School - This building has been razed.
 West High School - Consolidated with East High School in 1982, and the current location of Garden City Middle School.
 Henry Ruff Elementary- Since 2010. The building was used for educational purposes similar to Cambridge and hosted small events in the Garden City Community. It is now the new site for Burger East/ Burger Transition Center
 Dillon School - This building has been razed.
 Harrison School - Now a satellite campus for Garden City Hospital.

References

External links

 

School districts in Michigan
Education in Wayne County, Michigan
1929 establishments in Michigan